Pipher is a surname. Notable people with the surname include:

Jill Pipher (born 1955), American mathematician
Judith Pipher (1940–2022), American astrophysicist and astronomer
Mary Pipher (born 1947), American clinical psychologist and author

See also
Piper (surname)